Arthur Peters may refer to:

 Arthur Peters (Canadian politician) (1854–1908), Canadian politician
 Arthur Peters (bishop) (born 1935), Canadian Anglican bishop
 Arthur Peters (British politician) (1867–1956), British politician
 Arthur Peters (Australian cricketer) (1872–1903), Australian cricketer
 Arthur Peters (South African cricketer) (1904-1988), South African cricketer
 Arthur Peters (Royal Navy officer) (1888–1979), British Royal Navy officer